The third and final SAARC Quadrangular was held in Dhaka in February 1997. The Pakistan 'A' team, led by Asif Mujtaba, won the trophy after beating India 'A' in a rain affected final.

The teams
For the first time Pakistan and Sri Lanka took the tournament seriously, and sent strong teams. Asif Mujtaba, the Pak captain, led from the front, and finished as the Player of the Tournament. He was helped in the batting department by Basit Ali and Akhtar Sarfraz. The bowling attack was led by Mohammad Zahid, arguably the fastest bowler at the time. While he struggled with no balls and wides, he still generated lot of pace from the slow wickets, and was a constant menace to the opposition batsmen. medium pacer Azhar Mahmood came good in the final.

The Indian team, (led by Amay Khurasiya, failed to perform up to expectation. In the group match, they were badly beaten by Pak 'A', as the Indian batting collapsed badly. Only the makeshift opener MSK Prasad batted bravely to carry his bat thorough the innings for 56. The next highest score was by Mr. Extra (48). India, However, can consider them a bit unlucky in the final, as they were still in the game (with in form S. Sarath and MSK Prasad at the wicket) when rain intervened, and calculators were used to determine the champions. Indian medium pacer, Harvinder Singh was the top bowler of the tournament with 12 wickets.
Sri Lanka achieved their first (and only) victory in SAARC Quadrangular history by beating Bangladesh by 5 wickets. Naveed Nawaz and Ruwan Kalpage batted consistently for the Lankans.

Although the local side (Coached by WI legend Gordon Greenidge) lost all their 3 games, there was no disgrace as all the oppositions were much stronger. The batting looked good, the skipper Akram Khan, his deputy Aminul Islam, the veteran Minhajul Abedin and the youngster Sanwar Hossain all warmed up well for the upcoming ICC trophy with a half century each. The bowling, however, looked completely harmless. Anisur Rahman who did so much damage with the reverse swing in 1994-95 failed to make any impact this time.

Scores in brief

The final
Despite the fact that the local side had been eliminated, a strong holiday crowd gathered to watch the final between the two traditional rivals of the region. They saw plenty of good cricket, but unfortunately late afternoon rain spoiled an exciting finish. The Pak side won the toss and decided to bat first. The Indian new ball bowlers Debashish Mohanty and Arindam Sarkar struck early blows to leave the opposition struggling at 29/2. The Pak captain started the recovery sharing 41 for the 3rd wicket with Akhtar Sarfraz (31). The Pak captain went on to score 91, but he got little support from the middle order. Only Mujahid Jamshed with 26 stood firm. Pakistan lost their last 6 wickets for only 62 runs as off spinner Noel David and the most successful bowler of the tournament Harvinder Singh destroyed the lower order. The Paks batted for only 43.2 overs.

In reply, the India 'A' got off to a solid start, as their opening pair of Wasim Jaffer and Gagan Khoda defied the new ball attack of Aaqib Javed and Mohammad Zahid. The openers, However, failed to convert starts into scores. The skipper, Amay Khurasiya, batting at No. 3, made 27, but the introduction of Azhar Mahmood into the bowling changed the course of the game. Fromn 69/1, India 'A' slumped to 112/5. The run out of Sairaj Bahutule didn't help their. Still they fancied their chances with S. Sarath at the wicket. But the weather had the last say, and according to the Parabola method, Pakistan'A' were declared the winners. Asif Mujtaba was adjudged the player of the Final.

Top batsmen of the tournament (80 or more runs)

Note:The Bangladesh middle order batsman Minhajul Abedin played in only one game, and scored 53, thus finishing with an average of 53.00

Top bowlers of the tournament (5 or more wickets)

Top all-rounder of the tournament

Notes
1) The Sri Lanka 'A' team achieved their first and only victory in SAARC Quadrangular history by beating Bangladesh by 5 wickets.

2) The Pak team was unusually generous in giving extra runs. In total, they gave away 120 extras (71 wides, 28 No balls, 28 leg byes and 2 Byes). This a record for the SAARC Quadrangular.

3) Asif Mujtaba's 91 is the 2nd highest score in SAARC Quadrangular history, after Navjot Singh Sidhu's unbeaten 95 against Pak 'A' in 1992.

4) Harvinder Singh's 6/43 against Pakistan 'A' is the best bowling in the tournament's history, improving Tanvir Mehedi's 5/23 against Bangladesh in 1992.

5) In the game against Pak 'A', the Bangladesh last wicket pair of Hasibul Hossain and Anisur Rahman put on unbeaten 51 runs, a tournament record for the 10 wicket partnership.

References

Quadrangular, 1996
1996 in cricket
1997 in Bangladeshi sport
1997 in cricket
1996 in Bangladeshi sport
Bangladeshi cricket in the 20th century
International cricket competitions from 1994–95 to 1997